Pantelis Panourgias (born 13 April 1998) is a Greek professional footballer who plays as a centre-back for Super League 2 club Kavala.

Honours
PAS Giannina
 Super League Greece 2: 2019–20

Eintracht Braunschweig U19
DFB-Junioren-Vereinspokal: 2016–17

References

1998 births
Living people
Greece youth international footballers
Greek expatriate footballers
Regionalliga players
Super League Greece 2 players
Eintracht Braunschweig II players
PAS Giannina F.C. players
Doxa Drama F.C. players
Association football defenders
Footballers from Athens
Greek footballers